Alstroemeria, commonly called the Peruvian lily or lily of the Incas, is a genus of flowering plants in the family Alstroemeriaceae. They are all native to South America, although some have become naturalized in the United States, Mexico, Australia, New Zealand, Madeira and the Canary Islands. Almost all of the species are restricted to one of two distinct centers of diversity; one in central Chile, the other in eastern Brazil. Species of Alstroemeria from Chile are winter-growing plants, while those of Brazil are summer growing. All are long-lived perennials except A. graminea, a diminutive annual from the Atacama Desert of Chile.

Description 
Plants of this genus grow from a cluster of tubers. They send up fertile and sterile stems, the fertile stems of some species reaching  in height. The leaves are alternately arranged and resupinate, twisted on the petioles so that the undersides face up. The leaves are variable in shape and the blades have smooth edges. The flowers are solitary or borne in umbels. They come in many shades of red, orange, purple, green, and white, flecked and striped and streaked with darker colors. There are six curving stamens. The stigma has three lobes. The fruit is a capsule with three valves. Alstroemeria are classified as an inferior monocot, meaning the petals are located above the ovary and the leaf veins are parallel.

Taxonomy 
The genus was described by Johan Peter Falk and his thesis supervisor Carl Linnaeus in his 1762 dissertation Planta Alströmeria. Linnaeus bears the botanical authority (L.).

Etymology 
The genus was named after the Swedish baron Clas Alströmer (1736–1794), a friend of Linnaeus.

Cultivation and uses 
Many hybrids and at least 190 cultivars have been developed, featuring many markings and colors, including white, yellow, orange, apricot, pink, red, purple, and lavender. The most popular and showy hybrids commonly grown today result from crosses between species from Chile (winter-growing) with species from Brazil (summer-growing). This strategy has overcome the florists' problem of seasonal dormancy and resulted in plants that are evergreen, or nearly so, and flower for most of the year. This breeding work derives mainly from trials that began in the United States in the 1980s; the main breeding is done nowadays by companies in the Netherlands. The flower, which resembles a miniature lily, is very popular for bouquets and flower arrangements in the commercial cut flower trade. These delicate flowers survive up to 14 days in water without any signs of shrivelling.

Most cultivars available for the home garden will bloom in the late spring and early summer. The plant requires at least six hours of morning sunlight, regular water, and well-drained soil.

AGM cultivars
The following cultivars have gained the Royal Horticultural Society's Award of Garden Merit, all with a hardiness rating of H4 (Hardy – average winter ) apart from 'Friendship' (H5: Hardy – cold winter ):

 'Apollo' (white/yellow flowers, 100 cm)
 'Cahors' (pink/yellow, 90 cm)

 'Coronet' (salmon/yellow flowers, 140 cm)
 'Friendship' (yellow flushed pink, 100 cm)
 'Orange Glory' (150 cm)
 'Oriana' (salmon/yellow, 50 cm)

 'Phoenix' (red/yellow, 100 cm)
 'Red Elf' (100 cm)
 'Sirius' (pink/yellow, 100 cm)
 'Sonata' (red/yellow, 100 cm)
 'Spitfire' (orange/yellow, 90 cm)
 'Tessa' (red flowers, 120 cm)
 'Yellow Friendship' (140 cm)

Ecology
Some alstroemerias have escaped cultivation and become weeds, such as Alstroemeria pulchella. and A. aurea, which are now weeds in Australia.

Species

See also

 List of plants known as lily

Citations

General sources 

 , published in Amoenitates Academicae 6: 247–262 1763

External links 

 
Flora of South America
Liliales genera